Rajesh Fattesingh Dhabre is an Indian musician. He composes Ambedkarite and Buddhist devotional music. His albums Buddha Hi Buddha Hai (2010) and Siddhartha (2013) are centered on Buddhism. He is from the city of Nagpur, India. He worked as a commissioner of customs in Mumbai. Currently Rajesh Dhabre working as a Director General Dr. Babasaheb Ambedkar Research and Training Institute (BARTI), Pune. Dr. Rajesh Dhabre is a singer, songwriter, and social worker, as well as an Ambedkarite-Buddhist from Maharashtra. He is the Managing Director of Sant Rohidas Leather Industries Development Corporation Limited, Mumbai.

Compositions

Rajesh Dhabre's album, Buddha Hi Buddha Hai, was the first of its kind to have songs composed in Bollywood style. Some of the songs were sung by famous singers. Other songs were sung by Dhabre and by his wife, Bhavana Rajesh Dhabre. The title track "Buddha Hi Buddha Hai," sung by Sonu Nigam, gained much popularity.

In 2013, he released his second album Siddhartha The Lotus Blossom. The album features the chants "Buddham Saranam Gachchami" sung by the Lata Mangeshkar. The album was launched by LM Music, a company owned by Mangeshkar. One of the songs on the album was "Gautam Se Sajaye Duniya."

His next album is about the life of Babasaheb Ambedkar and will be called Ambedkar The True Son of India. The album brings out the thought of Ambedkar's thoughts involving issues of national and social importance. The album will be released on 6 December 2015 on the occasion of "Mahparinirvan Din" of Dr.Babasaheb Ambedkar.

Albums

Sarnang (2015)
Bollywood's first ever tribute to Dr. Babasaheb Ambedkar-2016 on his 125th birth anniversary.

Siddhartha : The Lotus Blossoms (2013)

Buddha Hi Buddha Hai (2010)

References

External links
 

Indian male musicians
Living people
Indian male singers
Marathi people
Indian Buddhists
Year of birth missing (living people)